The Office du Niger is a semi-autonomous government agency in Mali that administers a large irrigation scheme in the Ségou Region of the country. Although the French colonial administration constructed the system to produce cotton for the textile industry, the main agricultural product is now rice. Around 320,000 tons are grown each year representing 40 percent of the total Malian production. Large quantities of sugar cane are also grown in joint ventures between a Chinese company and the Malian state. The irrigation scheme uses  of water each year corresponding to around 10 percent of the total flow of the Niger River.

Historical development

Niger river

The climate of both Mali and Guinea is determined by the West African Monsoon with the maximum rainfall occurring in August, but while the annual rainfall in the Guinea Highlands approaches , that at Markala is only . The short but relatively intense rainy season produces a surge of water flowing down the river system which in turn leads to the flooding of the Inner Niger Delta. Since the construction of the Sélingué hydroelectric dam on the Sankarani in 1982, some of the flood water has been retained and released later during the dry season.

Water management

Irrigation system

Before the construction of the Markala Dam these channels would fill with water during the annual flood.

Here the water is distributed into three canals, the Canal du Sahel that flows northwards to the Fala de Molodo, the Canal Costes-Ongoïba that supplies water to the Siribala sugar cane farm and the Canal Macina that carries water to the Fala de Boky-Wéré.

Irrigation impact on the river
On average the Office du Niger used around 10 percent of the total water in the river and although during the wet season only a small proportion was diverted, at the end of the dry season when the river discharge was at a minimum, a large proportion was used for irrigation. To satisfy some of the downstream requirements, there is an international agreement to allow at least  of water to flow past the Markala dam at all times. In March this left on average only  available for irrigation and in the driest year only . The water released by the Sélingué Dam to generate electrical power increased the flow of water in the dry season.

The maximum amount of water diverted from the river is set by the dimensions of the canal. Until the upgrade associated with the Alatona project in 2007-12 the greatest flow was around  but with the upgrade to the canal system flows of up to  should be possible. Taking into account the  passing through the dam, the Niger would need a flow of at least  to satisfy the demand. The river only has this amount of water between July and December in an average year and between August and November in a dry year.  There is a longstanding proposal to build a hydroelectric dam at Fomi in Guinea on the Niandan. The effect on the Niger at Markala would be similar to that of the Sélingué Dam: the flow would be reduced during the wet season and increased during the dry season. This increased flow during the dry season would allow the Office du Niger to divert additional water from the river.

Extent of irrigated areas
Keïta et al.
 of rice polders within the Office du Niger
 of new rice polders at Macina and Bewani
 of sugar cane
 of rice polders managed by the Opération Riz Ségou
 of land cultivated outside the Office du Niger embankments (hors-casiers)

The extent of the irrigated area has since increased. The N-Sukula joint venture setup in 2009 controls  of land of which  has been irrigated for the cultivation of sugar cane. The Millennium Challenge Corporation funded development at Alatona which ended in 2012, included  of rice polders and market gardens.

Sugar cane
Since the 1960s sugar cane has been cultivated in an area between Markala and Niono. The Dougabougou complex covering an area of 1654 ha between the Fala de Molodo and the Costes-Ongoïba Canal, was established in 1965 together with a sugar mill capable of processing 400 tonnes of cane a day. This was followed in 1974 by the establishment of the larger 3520 ha Siribala complex at the northern end of the Costes-Ongoïba canal. The associated mill had an initial daily capacity of 1000 tonnes. Both complexed were established with Chinese financial aid and managed by the Office du Niger. The farms employed salaried workers to grow the cane and hired seasonal workers at harvest time.

In 1996 the two sugar producing complexes were taken over by SUKALA, a Sino-Malian public–private partnership in a debt-to-equity swap arrangement with 60 percent of the 5 billion franc CFA (7.6 million Euro) equity held by China Light Industrial Corporation for Foreign Economic and Technical Co-operation (CLETC) and 40 percent by the Malian government. In 2009 the company produced around 39,000 tonnes of sugar and 2.8 million tonnes of ethanol. The sugar production represents about a quarter of the annual Malian consumption.

A separate Sino-Malian joint venture, N-SUKALA, was agreed in June 2009 between CLETC and the Malian government. Of the 8.8 billion franc CFA equity (13.4 million Euro), 60 percent is held by CLETC with the remainder held by the Malian state. The company is developing 20,000 ha of land near to the Dougabougou complex that had not previously been irrigated. At the time of the agreement the land was occupied by a number of villages.  The construction of a new sugar cane processing plant and refinery with a capacity of 6,000 tonnes a day, expandable to 8,000 tonnes was begun at the end of July 2009. The new sugar cane farm will be irrigated using several hundred rotary centre pivot sprinkler systems. The complex is expected to produce around 100,000 tonnes of sugar and 9.6 million tonnes of ethanol each year.

Alatona expansion
In November 2006 the Millennium Challenge Corporation, a United States foreign aid agency, signed a 460 million US dollar agreement with the Malian Government to develop the Alatona zone of the Office du Niger and to upgrade Bamako Airport. The project was intended to run for a period of five years between September 2007 to September 2012 but was terminated in May 2012 after a military coup deposed the elected civilian government of Amadou Toumani Touré. Of the total investment, 235 million US dollars were assigned to the Alatona irrigation project.

The Alatona Irrigation Project included the upgrading and paving of the 81 km of road between Niono with Goma Coura, increasing the capacity of the main canal system linking the Alatona region with the Niger River and the establishment of the Alatona region itself with its small irrigation canals and social infrastructure. The initial plan was to irrigate an area of 14,000 ha but this was later reduced to 5,200 ha.

Large-scale land leases

From around 2008, in an effort to attract foreign investment, the Malian government began offering 30 or 50 year leases on large areas of farmland that had not previously been irrigated. The aim was to bring about a large expansion of the total irrigated area. At the time, other than the Dougabougou and Siribala sugar cane plantations, all the irrigated land was cultivated by small family farms. The average area was around 3.3 ha. The farmers did not have title to the land which was all owned by the state.

The policy of granting leases on large areas of farmland has attracted criticism on the grounds that the procedure lacked transparency and the land rights of local communities were being ignored. Although the development of the leased land leads to a competition for water and requires resettlement of the resident population no environmental and social impact assessments have been published.

The most high-profile case is the Malibya project. In 2008 the Malian government awarded a 50-year renewable lease for 100,000 ha of un-irrigated farmland to the Libyan government. The land was to be managed by Malibya, a subsidiary of Libya's sovereign wealth fund. Although the details were not made public, a leaked copy of the agreement was later posted on the internet. No rent was to be paid for the land, but an annual fee of 2,470 F CFA (3.77 euro) was to be paid for each hectare irrigated by a sprinkler system. The land lies to the northeast of the town of Macina, and at the time was occupied by a number of villages.

As the first stage in the development, Malibya arranged for the constructed a 40 km canal and a new paved road by the China Geo-Engineering Corporation (CGC), a subsidiary of Sinopec. The canal begins at Kolongo Tomo and runs in a northeasterly direction parallel to the Fala de Boky-Wéré. It passes to the north of village of Boky Wéré and ends near the hamlet of Tangana. Malibya announced that they were planning to initially irrigate an area of 25,000 ha. Although the canal has a capacity of 130 m3/s, the maximum flow will be much less than this. According to the hydraulic report for the Alatona project, the capacity of the Canal du Macina that feeds water into the Fala de Boky-Wéré is 75 m3/s and this water is also used to irrigate the existing 20,712 ha of the Macina irrigation zone.

Notes

References
.
.
.
.
.
.
.
.
.
.
.

Further reading
.
.
. Available within the US from the HathiTrust.
.
.(Full text online from Jan 2013)
.
.
.
.
.
.
.

External links
Official web site of the Office du Niger.

Irrigation projects
Organisations based in Mali